The Storm of Kokenhusen by the Russian Army under Tsar Alexei Mikhailovich was one of the first events of the Russo-Swedish War (1656–1658), a theater of the Second Northern War. On 14 August 1656 Russian troops stormed and captured the well-fortified town of Kokenhusen (Koknese) in Swedish Livonia (present-day Latvia)

According to the Tsar, this town “was very strong, had a deep moat, like a small brother of the Kremlin's moat, and its fortress is like a son of Smolensk's fortress”. Tsar also gave city new name, "Tsarevich-Dmitriev" in honor of his infant son, Tsarevich Dmitry Alexeyevich of Russia, who had died in 1649. This new name didn't last since in 1681 city was returned to Swedish Livonia. 

After capturing Kokenhusen, Russia gained control of the Daugava River and the way to Riga was opened.

References 

Koknese
Second Northern War
Kokenhusen
Kokenhusen
Conflicts in 1656
1656 in Europe
17th century in Latvia
Swedish Livonia